Maisel is a surname. Notable people with the surname include:

 Alan Maisel
 Charlie Maisel
 David Maisel, Marvel Studios producer
 Ernst Maisel
 Fritz Maisel
 George Maisel
 Ileen Maisel
 Ivan Maisel, sports writer
 Jay Maisel
 Mordechai Maisel
 Shiah Maisel, singer

See also 
 Brauerei Gebr. Maisel, German brewery
 Maisel Brau Bamberg, defunct German brewery
 Maisel European Gallery Collection, see Mobile Museum of Art
 Maisel Oil Company, defunct Scottish company
 Maisel Synagogue
 Maisel's Indian Trading Post, Albuquerque, New Mexico
 The Marvelous Mrs. Maisel, American television program
 Meisel

Jewish surnames
German-language surnames